Balmer is a surname. Notable people with the surname include:

Earl Balmer (born 1935), former NASCAR Cup Series driver
Thomas Balmer (born 1952), Oregon Chief Justice
 Edwin Balmer (1883–1959), American science fiction writer
 Jack Balmer (1916–1984), English football player
 Jacqueline Balmer or Jacquie de Creed (1957–2011), British stuntwoman
 John Balmer (1910–1944), Royal Australian Air Force officer
 Johann Jakob Balmer (1825–1898), Swiss mathematician and physicist
 Lori Balmer, Australian pop singer
 Randall Balmer (born 1954), American author
 Robert Balmer (1787–1844), Scottish theologian

See also
 Ballmer, surname

German-language surnames